Orlando Airport may refer to:

Orlando Apopka Airport (X04) – a general aviation airport northwest of Orlando in Apopka, Florida
Orlando Executive Airport (ORL) – a general aviation and reliever airport east of Orlando city center
Orlando International Airport (MCO) – the primary commercial service airport for Orlando, Florida
Melbourne Orlando International Airport (MLB) - a secondary commercial service airport southeast of Orlando in Melbourne, Florida
Orlando Sanford International Airport (SFB) – a secondary commercial service airport north of Orlando in Sanford, Florida